Pastaza may refer to:

Pastaza River of Ecuador and Peru
Pastaza Province, Ecuador